The battle of 'Amran, refers to a battle that took place in the summer of 2014, between the Houthi Zaydi movement, and the Yemeni government of President Abdrabbuh Mansur Hadi. The Houthis eventually won the battle, leading them to the capture of Sanaa.

Background

The Houthi rebels have battled against Islah-backed forces in the rural regions of Amran from the February 2014, when they first attacked the government held areas from mountains around them. During the first week of the clashes, an estimated number of 7,100 people, left the city, and some 450,000 to be inside the en-conflict regions of the 'Amran Governorate. From October 2013, 81,000 residents have abandoned the town.

The main battle
The battle begin in the early days of July 2014 when Houthi rebels stormed the city of Amran, guarded by the general Hameed Al-Qushaibi.
On 8 July 2014, army reinforcements sent to Amran on Sunday were locked in fierce clashes with Shiite Houthi in Dharawan, 15 kilometres (nine miles) from Sanaa, and in and around the city itself, military sources said. On the same day, Hadi fighter jets bombed Amran's Warak neighborhood, hours after it was seized by rebels. During previous battles, 460 people left dead, with some 160  to be wounded, including civilians. On July 9, Yemeni government accused the Houthi rebels for atrocities, during a raid in the headquarters of the 310th Armored Brigade, looted weapons and equipment there, and killed a number of soldiers and officers, said Yemen's Supreme Security Committee, quoted by state news agency Saba. Along the dead, was the general responsibly for the region, Hameed Al-Qushaibi. The general, later mourned for his death. The Houthi fighters, broken the deal between them and general al-Qushaibi, that has the Houthi to allowed his brigade to abandon the city, and bringing an end to the fight in Amran. However another pact made with the Houthis, to retreat from the Amran city, but the pact never took place, allowing the Houthis to attack and capture Sana'a. Amran was fully captured by 10 July 2014.

Aftermath
After the fall of Amran in August, the Houthis began holding mass demonstrations in Sana'a, pressuring President Abd Rabbuh Mansur Hadi to reverse a cut to fuel subsidies and calling on the government to step down. Representatives of the group met with government officials in an attempt to find a solution to the standoff, but the Houthis rejected the government's concessions as insufficient. On 9 September, Houthi protesters in northwest Sana'a were fired upon by security forces as they marched on the cabinet office. Seven were killed. the Houthis, finally stormed the Sana'a in 16 of September, and captured in 21 of the month.

Conspiracy theories
During a film by Al Jazeera, some officials with hidden faces claimed that the fall of Amran was allowed by the Hadi government, to eventually remove General al-Qushaibi from power, eventually lead him in death, and the capital on the Houthis. Many believe that the Houthis and Hadi were concerted to leave Amran to fall to the Houthis.

References

2014 in Yemen
Amran
Amran
Amran
Houthi insurgency in Yemen
Yemeni Crisis (2011–present)
Amran District